Serhiy Litovchenko may refer to:
 Serhiy Litovchenko (footballer born 1979), Ukrainian footballer
 Serhiy Litovchenko (footballer born 1987), Ukrainian footballer